Miccolamia tuberculipennis is a species of beetle in the family Cerambycidae. It was described by Breuning in 1947. It is known from China.

References

Desmiphorini
Beetles described in 1947